Catherine Cusack (born 21 December 1968) is a British actress. She is best known for portraying Nanny Carmel Finnan in the long-running ITV soap opera Coronation Street in 1992 and 1993.

Early life and career
Cusack was born on 21 December 1968 in London, the half-sister of the actresses Sinéad Cusack, Sorcha Cusack and Niamh Cusack, and the fourth daughter of the Irish actor Cyril Cusack. Catherine's mother was her father's long-term mistress, Mary Rose Cunningham; Catherine was their only child together. Her parents married in 1979 after the death of her father's first wife. She is half-sister to theatre producer Pádraig Cusack and television producer Paul Cusack. She was accepted to study at Royal Holloway and Bedford New College, but became a stage manager at the Tricycle Theatre in London. She made her professional debut in Brendan Behan's play The Hostage before making her television debut in the Doctor Who serial Paradise Towers (1987). She performed on stage with her half-sister Sinéad Cusack in Our Lady of Sligo by Sebastian Barry at the National Theatre in London, the Gate Theatre, Dublin and the Irish Arts Centre in New York.

Catherine Cusack is married to the British actor Alex Palmer.

Selected filmography
 The Lonely Passion of Judith Hearne (1987) ... as Una
 Finding Neverland (2004) as Sarah

Selected stage roles
 Mill on the Floss
 Moonlight
 The Glass Menagerie
 Brighton Rock
 The Seagull
 Bold Girls
 You Never Can Tell
 Poor Beast in the Rain
 Agnes of God
 Veronica's Room
 Nothing Sacred
 Les Liaisons Dangereuses
 Now Is The Hour
 The Two-Character Play
 King Lear

Selected television roles
 Doctor Who: Paradise Towers (1987) ... as Blue Kang Leader
 Sophia and Constance (1988) ... as Constance
 Coronation Street (1992–93) ... as Carmel Finnan 
 Ballykissangel (1999–2001) ... as Frankie Sullivan
 The Bill ... as Dawn
 The Chief ... as Hilary Scott
 Cadfael ... as Catherine
 The Open Window ... as Vera
 Doctors (2012) ... as Connie Miller

References

External links

1968 births
Living people
20th-century English actresses
21st-century English actresses
Actresses from London
Catherine
English film actresses
English stage actresses
English television actresses
English people of Irish descent